The 12th annual Venice International Film Festival was held from 20 August to 10 September 1951.

Jury 
 Mario Gromo
 Antonio Baldini
 Ermanno Contini
 Fabrizio Dentice
 Piero Gadda Conti
 Vinicio Marinucci
 Gian Gaspare Napolitano
 Gian Luigi Rondi
 Giorgio Vigolo

In Competition

Awards
Golden Lion of Saint Mark
 Best Film -  Rashomon (Akira Kurosawa)
Best Italian Film 
Four Ways Out (Pietro Germi) 
Special Jury Prize
A Streetcar Named Desire (Elia Kazan)
Volpi Cup
Best Actor - Jean Gabin (The Night Is My Kingdom) 
Best Actress - Vivien Leigh (A Streetcar Named Desire)
Golden Osella
Best Original Screenplay - T. E. B. Clarke (The Lavender Hill Mob) 
Best Cinematography - Léonce-Henri Burel (Journal d'un curé de campagne)
Best Original Music - Hugo Friedhofer (Ace in the Hole)
International Award
Journal d'un curé de campagne (Robert Bresson)
Le Fleuve (Jean Renoir)
Ace in the Hole (Billy Wilder)
OCIC Award
Journal d'un curé de campagne (Robert Bresson)
Italian Film Critics Award
Rashomon (Akira Kurosawa)
Journal d'un curé de campagne (Robert Bresson)
Special Prize
Murder in the Cathedral (Peter Pendrey) (For the best production design)

References

External links
 
 Venice Film Festival 1951 Awards on IMDb

1951 film festivals
1951 in Italy
Venice Film Festival
Film
August 1951 events in Europe
September 1951 events in Europe